57th New York Film Critics Circle Awards
January 12, 1992

Best Picture:
 The Silence of the Lambs 
The 57th New York Film Critics Circle Awards, honoring the best filmmaking of 1991, were announced on 17 December 1991 and presented on 12 January 1992.

Winners
Best Actor: 
Anthony Hopkins - The Silence of the Lambs
Runners-up: River Phoenix - My Own Private Idaho and Nick Nolte - The Prince of Tides
Best Actress: 
Jodie Foster - The Silence of the Lambs
Runners-up: Geena Davis and Susan Sarandon - Thelma & Louise
Best Cinematography: 
Roger Deakins - Barton Fink
Runner-up: Freddie Francis - Cape Fear
Best Director: 
Jonathan Demme - The Silence of the Lambs
Runner-up: Gus Van Sant - My Own Private Idaho
Best Documentary: 
Paris Is Burning
Runner-up: Hearts of Darkness: A Filmmaker's Apocalypse
Best Film: 
The Silence of the Lambs
Runner-up: My Own Private Idaho
Best Foreign Language Film: 
Europa Europa • Germany/France
Runner-up: The Vanishing (Spoorloos) • Netherlands/France
Best New Director: 
John Singleton - Boyz n the Hood
Runner-up: Anthony Minghella - Truly, Madly, Deeply
Best Screenplay: 
David Cronenberg - Naked Lunch
Runner-up: Calder Willingham - Rambling Rose
Best Supporting Actor: 
Samuel L. Jackson - Jungle Fever
Runners-up: Steven Hill - Billy Bathgate and John Goodman - Barton Fink
Best Supporting Actress: 
Judy Davis - Naked Lunch and Barton Fink
Runners-up: Juliette Lewis - Cape Fear and Kate Nelligan - Frankie and Johnny and The Prince of Tides

References

External links
1991 Awards

1991
New York Film Critics Circle Awards
New York Film Critics Circle Awards
New York Film Critics Circle Awards
New York Film Critics Circle Awards
New York Film Critics Circle Awards